"Red Room" is the debut solo single by American rapper Offset, from his debut studio album Father of 4. Produced by Metro Boomin, the song was officially released alongside its music video on February 14, 2019, but was previously made available for a short time on November 30, 2018, before later being taken down.

Background
After both other members of Migos, Quavo and Takeoff released their solo studio albums, Offset's was expected to be released on December 14, 2018. "Red Room" was to precede the album, and was made available on November 30, 2018, before being taken down without explanation other than Offset saying the album would be "out soon".

Critical reception
The song was called "introspective" and a "look into" Offset's life on which he raps about "growing up with no father, his brother's arrest, and his brush with death" by XXL.

Music video
The music video was released along with the song on February 14, 2019. It is directed by Aisultan Seitov. The video makes use of a fish-eye lens and features a car accident, which was considered a "reinterpretation" of Offset's real car accident from 2018.

Charts

Certifications

References

2019 debut singles
2019 songs
Offset (rapper) songs
Song recordings produced by Metro Boomin
Songs written by Offset (rapper)
Songs written by Metro Boomin
Capitol Records singles
Motown singles

Trap music songs